The 1982 New York Yankees season was the 80th season for the Yankees. The team finished in fifth place in the American League Eastern Division with a record of 79–83, finishing 16 games behind the AL Champion Milwaukee Brewers. As a result, the Yankees endured their first losing season since going 80–82 in 1973, the team's final season at the original Yankee Stadium before the 1976 renovations. The Yankees were managed by Gene Michael, Bob Lemon, and Clyde King. The Yankees played their home games at Yankee Stadium.

Mel Allen, the long time Yankees play-by-play commentator, returned that season this time as a cable PBP man for the Yankees broadcasts on SportsChannel NY with Fran Healy, with former partner Phil Rizzuto alternating with him. He had been a familiar face to many for several years now since his return to television in 1975 as the voice-over narrator and presenter for the hit program This Week in Baseball.

Offseason 
 October 13, 1981: Eric Soderholm was released by the New York Yankees.
 October 21, 1981: Willie McGee was traded by the Yankees to the St. Louis Cardinals for Bob Sykes.
 November 4, 1981: Brian Ryder (minors) and a player to be named later were traded by the Yankees to the Cincinnati Reds for Ken Griffey, Sr. The Yankees completed the deal by sending Freddie Toliver to the Reds on December 9.
 November 17, 1981: Aurelio Rodríguez was traded by the New York Yankees to the Toronto Blue Jays for a player to be named later. The Toronto Blue Jays sent Mike Lebo (minors) (December 9, 1981) to the New York Yankees to complete the trade.
 February 22, 1982: Barry Evans was purchased by the Yankees from the San Diego Padres.
 March 30, 1982: Andy McGaffigan and Ted Wilborn were traded by the Yankees to the San Francisco Giants for Doyle Alexander.

Regular season 
 April 6, 1982, Opening Day vs. the Texas Rangers was snowed out, as a blizzard brought more than a foot of snow to New York; additional games were also postponed due to the stadium not being cleared. The team would finally start their season on April 11, with a doubleheader against the Chicago White Sox.
 April 27, 1982, Reggie Jackson returned to Yankee Stadium with the Angels. He broke out of a terrible season-starting slump to hit a home run off former teammate Ron Guidry. The at-bat began with Yankee fans, angry at Steinbrenner for letting Jackson get away, starting the "Reg-GIE!" chant, and ended it with the fans chanting "Steinbrenner sucks!" By the time of Jackson's election to the Hall of Fame, Steinbrenner had begun to say that letting him go was the biggest mistake he made as Yankee owner.
 September 5, 1982: Roy Smalley hit home runs from both sides of plate for New York Yankees.
 Future NFL Hall of Famer John Elway played baseball for the New York Yankees' Oneonta single-A farm club in 1982. Elway posted a .318 average and knocked in a team-high 24 runs with no errors in 42 games.

Season standings

Record vs. opponents

Opening Day lineup

Notable transactions 
 April 1, 1982: Bill Caudill was acquired by the Yankees from the Chicago Cubs to complete an earlier deal (the Cubs sent players to be named later to the Yankees for Pat Tabler) made on August 19, 1981.
 April 1, 1982: Bill Caudill, Gene Nelson and a player to be named later were traded by the Yankees to the Seattle Mariners for Shane Rawley. The Yankees completed the deal by sending Bobby Brown to the Mariners on April 6.
 April 5, 1982: Brad Gulden was traded by the Yankees to the Montreal Expos for Bobby Ramos.
 April 10, 1982: Ron Davis, Greg Gagne and Paul Boris were traded by the Yankees to  the Minnesota Twins for Roy Smalley III.
 April 23, 1982: Bob Watson was traded by the Yankees to the Atlanta Braves for Scott Patterson (minors).
 May 5, 1982: Dave Revering, Tom Dodd, and Jeff Reynolds (minors) were traded by the Yankees to the Toronto Blue Jays for John Mayberry.
 May 12, 1982: Larry Milbourne, Pete Filsen, John Pacella and cash were traded by the Yankees to the Minnesota Twins for Butch Wynegar and Roger Erickson.
 August 8, 1982: Bucky Dent was traded by the Yankees to the Texas Rangers for Lee Mazzilli.
 August 31, 1982: Tommy John was traded by the Yankees to the California Angels for a player to be named later. The Angels completed the deal by sending Dennis Rasmussen to the Yankees on November 24.

Draft picks 
 June 7, 1982: 1982 Major League Baseball Draft
Bo Jackson was drafted by the Yankees in the 2nd round, but did not sign.
Dan Pasqua was drafted by the Yankees in the 3rd round.
B. J. Surhoff was drafted by the Yankees in the 5th round, but did not sign.
Jim Deshaies was drafted by the Yankees in the 21st round.
Mike York was drafted by the Yankees in the 40th round.

Roster

Player stats

Batting

Starters by position 
Note: Pos = Position; G = Games played; AB = At bats; R = Runs scored; H = Hits; Avg. = Batting average; HR = Home runs; RBI = Runs batted in; SB = Stolen bases

Other batters 
Note: G = Games played; AB = At bats; R = Runs scored; H = Hits; Avg. = Batting average; HR = Home runs; RBI = Runs batted in; SB = Stolen bases

Pitching

Starting pitchers 
Note: G = Games pitched; IP = Innings pitched; W = Wins; L = Losses; ERA = Earned run average; SO = Strikeouts

Other pitchers 
Note: G = Games pitched; IP = Innings pitched; W = Wins; L = Losses; ERA = Earned run average; SO = Strikeouts

Relief pitchers 
Note: G = Games pitched; W = Wins; L = Losses; SV = Saves; ERA = Earned run average; SO = Strikeouts

Awards and honors 
 Ron Guidry, Goose Gossage and Dave Winfield represented the Yankees at the 1982 Major League Baseball All-Star Game.
 Gold Gloves were awarded to pitcher, Ron Guidry and outfielder, Dave Winfield.
 Dave Winfield, Silver Slugger Award.

Farm system 

LEAGUE CHAMPIONS: Nashville, Fort Lauderdale, Greensboro, GCL Yankees

Notes

References 
1982 New York Yankees at Baseball Reference.com
1982 New York Yankees team page at www.baseball-almanac.com

New York Yankees seasons
New York Yankees
New York Yankees
1980s in the Bronx